Grand River Township is an inactive township in Cass County, in the U.S. state of Missouri with a population of 11,655.

Grand River Township was established in 1872, taking its name from the Grand River.

References

Townships in Missouri
Townships in Cass County, Missouri